Kactoos is a defunct social network service and group buying site created by Kactoos Group and headquartered in Miami, Florida. Its slogan is "Shop together and save". Kactoos is available in Spanish and Portuguese.

The site is not an online store, but a shopping platform that allows users to join groups in order to buy a particular item. The more users join a specific product's group, the lower will its price be. This mechanism is known as Tuangou.

References

External links
 Kactoos.com - Official Site

Defunct social networking services